There are many Grade II listed buildings in the City of Manchester, England. The majority of Manchester's listed buildings date from the Victorian (1837–1901) and Edwardian era (1901–1911), most as a consequence of the Industrial Revolution. In England and Wales the authority for listing is granted by the Planning (Listed Buildings and Conservation Areas) Act 1990 and is administered by English Heritage, an agency of the Department for Digital, Culture, Media and Sport. There are three categories of listing – Grade I, Grade II* and Grade II.

Grade I is the highest listing category usually reserved for buildings of international stature; only 2.5% of listed buildings are Grade I. Grade II* comprises 5.5% of all listed building and are historic works worthy of special interest. The lowest and most common listing is Grade II, reserved for works which are architecturally, culturally or historically notable and warrant preservation. Manchester has fifteen Grade I listed buildings and 77 Grade II* listed buildings. This list concerns Grade II buildings in Manchester, Greater Manchester, England.

Buildings

See also
Grade I listed buildings in Manchester
Grade II* listed buildings in Manchester

References 

 
Manchester
Lists of listed buildings in Greater Manchester
Lists of buildings and structures in Manchester